Antonio Blasevich (18 August 1902 – 1976) was an Italian professional football player and coach.

Honours
 Serie A champion: 1929/30.

External links
 Antonio Blasevich at encclopediadelcalcio.it

1902 births
Italian footballers
Serie A players
Serie B players
U.S. Triestina Calcio 1918 players
Inter Milan players
Palermo F.C. players
S.S.C. Napoli players
Italian football managers
Calcio Padova managers
Footballers from Split, Croatia
Year of death missing
Association football midfielders